Rhis is a genus of kelp fly in the family Coelopidae.

Species
Rhis popeae (McAlpine, 1991)
Rhis whitleyi McAlpine, 1991

References

Coelopidae
Sciomyzoidea genera